Bishkek Observer is an English-language weekly newspaper published in Bishkek, Kyrgyzstan.

History and profile
The Bishkek Observer is based in Bishkek and is a weekly newspaper published in English language. The paper has both international and local editions.

References

English-language newspapers published in Asia
Mass media in Bishkek
Newspapers published in Kyrgyzstan
Weekly newspapers
Publications with year of establishment missing